Year 1131 (MCXXXI) was a common year starting on Thursday (link will display the full calendar) of the Julian calendar.

Events 
 By place 

 Levant 
 August 21 – King Baldwin II falls seriously ill, after his return from Antioch. He is moved to the patriarch's residence near the Holy Sepulchre, where he bequeaths the kingdom to his daughter Melisende, her husband Fulk and their infant son, Baldwin. He takes monastic vows, and dies soon after. Baldwin is buried in the Church of the Holy Sepulchre, at Jerusalem.
 September 14 – Melisende succeeds her father Baldwin II to the throne, and reigns jointly with Fulk, as King and Queen of Jerusalem. Their coronation, in the Church of the Holy Sepulchre, is celebrated with festivities.

 Europe 
 Ramon Berenguer III (the Great), count of Barcelona, dies after a 34-year reign. He leaves most of his Catalonian territories to his elder son Ramon Berenguer IV, who continues the fight against the Almoravid Muslims. His younger son Berenguer Ramon inherits Provence (Southern France) and will reign as Ramon I (until 1144).
 The Knights Templars appear in the North-East of Spain and are receiving privileges from King Alfonso I (the Battler). The Templars support him to regain land from the Almoravids. Alfonso grants them exemption of tax on a fifth of the wealth taken from the Muslims. The Templars found their first stronghold in Aragon.
 October 13 – The 15-year-old Philip, eldest son of King Louis VI (the Fat) of France, dies when his horse trips over a black pig that darts out of a dung heap unexpectedly at a market in Paris.

 By topic 

 Religion 
 May 9 – Tintern Abbey is founded in Wales by Cistercian monks in the Wye Valley.
 Construction begins on the Beisi Pagoda in Jiangsu Province (approximate date).
 The Council of Rheims is held by several French bishops and many clergy.

Births 
 January 14 – Valdemar I (the Great), king of Denmark (d. 1182)
 November 8 – Myeongjong, Korean king of Goryeo (d. 1202)
 Eudoxia of Kiev, high duchess of Poland (approximate date)
 Henry of Sandomierz, Polish nobleman (approximate date)
 Fujiwara no Teishi, Japanese noblewoman (d. 1176)
 Ladislaus II, king of Hungary and Croatia (d. 1163)
 Nakayama Tadachika, Japanese nobleman (d. 1195)

Deaths 
 January 7 – Canute Lavard, duke of Schleswig (b. 1096)
 April 30 – Adjutor, French knight and saint
 August 21 – Baldwin II, king of Jerusalem 
 August 30 – Hervey le Breton, English bishop
 October 5 – Frederick I, German archbishop
 October 13 – Philip, co-king of France (b. 1116)
 October 24 – Gerard II, count of Guelders
 November 16 – Dobrodeia of Kiev, Byzantine princess
 December 4 – Omar Khayyám, Persian astronomer (b. 1048)
 Abu Ali Ahmed ibn al-Afdal, Fatimid vizier
 Alger of Liège, French monk and writer (b. 1055)
 Andronikos Komnenos, Byzantine prince (or 1130)
 Ayn al-Quzat Hamadani, Persian philosopher (b. 1098)
 Elizabeth of Vermandois, English countess 
 Feardana Ua Cárthaigh, Irish chief poet
 Gaston IV of Béarn, French nobleman
 Harald Haakonsson, Norse Earl of Orkney
 Joscelin I (Courtenay), count of Edessa
 Mahmud II, sultan of the Seljuk Empire 
 Maud (or Matilda), queen of Scotland
 Meng, Chinese empress and regent  (b. 1073)
 Ramon Berenguer III, count of Barcelona (b. 1082)
 Stephen II, king of Hungary and Croatia (b. 1101)
 Zheng (or Xiansu), Chinese empress (b. 1079)

References

Sources